This is a list of articles on education organized by country:

A

Education in Afghanistan
Education in Albania
Education in Angola
Education in Argentina
Education in Armenia
Education in Australia
Education in Austria
Education in Azerbaijan

B

Education in Bahrain
Education in Bangladesh
Education in Barbados
Education in Belarus
Education in Belgium
Education in Bhutan
Education in Bolivia
Education in Bosnia and Herzegovina
Education in Botswana
Education in Brazil
Education in Brunei
Education in Bulgaria
Education in Burkina Faso

C

Education in Cambodia
Education in Cameroon
Education in Canada
Education in Alberta
Education in Ontario
Education in Québec
Education in Catalonia
Education in Chad
Education in Chile
Education in China
Education in Hong Kong
Education in Macau
Education in Colombia
Education in Comoros
Education in the Democratic Republic of the Congo
Education in the Republic of the Congo
Education in the Cook Islands
Education in Costa Rica
Education in Côte d'Ivoire
Education in Croatia
Education in Cuba
Education in the Czech Republic
Education in Czechoslovakia (historical)

D

Education in Denmark
Education in the Dominican Republic

E

Education in Egypt
Education in El Salvador
Education in England
Education in Eritrea
Education in Estonia

F

Education in Fiji
Education in Finland
Education in France

G

Education in Gabon
Education in the Gambia
Education in Germany
Education in East Germany (historical)
Education in Ghana
Education in Greece
Education in Guyana

H

Education in Hungary
Education in Hong Kong

I

Education in Iceland
Education in India
Education in Indonesia
Education in Iran
Education in Iraq
Education in Ireland
Education in Israel
Education in Italy

J

Education in Japan
 Education in Jamaica
Education in Jordan

K

Education in Kazakhstan
Education in Kenya
Education in Korea
Education in North Korea
Education in South Korea
Education in Kosovo
Education in Kuwait
Education in Kyrgyzstan

L

Education in Laos
Education in Latvia
Education in Lebanon
Education in Liberia
Education in Libya
Education in Liechtenstein
Education in Lithuania

M
Education in Macau
Education in Madagascar
Education in Malaysia
Education in the Maldives
Education in Mali
Education in Mauritania
Education in Mauritius
Education in Mexico
Education in Moldova
Education in Mongolia
Education in Montenegro
Education in Morocco
Education in Mozambique
Education in Myanmar

N

Education in Namibia
Education in Nepal
Education in the Netherlands
Education in New Zealand
Education in Nicaragua
Education in Niger
Education in Nigeria
Education in Northern Cyprus
Education in Northern Ireland
Education in North Macedonia
Education in Norway

O

Education in Oman

P

Education in Pakistan
Education in Palestine
Education in Panama
Education in Papua New Guinea
Education in Paraguay
Education in Peru
Education in the Philippines
Education in Poland
Underground Education in Poland During World War II (historical)
Education in the People's Republic of Poland (historical)
Education in Portugal

Q

Education in Qatar

R

Education in Romania
Education in Russia
Education in Rwanda

S

Education in the Soviet Union (historical)
Education in Saudi Arabia
Education in Scotland
Education in Senegal
Education in Serbia
Education in Seychelles
Education in Singapore
Education in Slovakia
Education in Slovenia
Education in Somalia
Education in South Africa
Education in Spain
Education in Sri Lanka
Education in Sudan
Education in Suriname
Education in Sweden
Education in Switzerland
Education in Syria

T

Education in Taiwan
Education in Tajikistan
Education in Tanzania
Education in Thailand
Education in Trinidad and Tobago
Education in Tunisia
Education in Turkey
Education in Turkmenistan

U

Education in Uganda
Education in Ukraine
Education in the United Arab Emirates
Education in the United Kingdom
Education in England
Education in Northern Ireland
Education in Scotland
Education in Wales
Education in the United States
Education in Puerto Rico
Education in Uganda
Education in Uzbekistan

V

Education in Venezuela
Education in Vietnam

W
Education in Wales

Y

Education in Yemen

Z

Education in Zambia
Education in Zimbabwe

See also
 List of basic education topics
 Compulsory education
Outline of education
Progressive education
Human rights education
Education for sustainable development